Jinlihua Plaza ( is an unfinished skyscraper in Luohu, Shenzhen, China. It is located opposite of Shun Hing Square and has a floor area of 78,536 m2. The building was abandoned prior to completion in 1999 after contractual and financial reasons.

See also
 Zhengshun Plaza

References

Skyscrapers in Shenzhen